The arena hosted the Opening Ceremony of Expo 2010 on April 30 and Closing Ceremony six months later on October 31, 2010. It has since then been opened for a variety of events such as concerts, musical shows and sporting events soon after the conclusion of the event.

This is a list events held at the Mercedes-Benz Arena, Shanghai.

Concerts

Mandarin/Cantonese

Japanese and Korean

International

Sports
October 13, 2013: NBA preseason game - Los Angeles Lakers vs Golden State Warriors

October 9–10, 2015: 拳王之江湖 — 权力联盟

October 14, 2015: NBA Pre-Season Game - Los Angeles Clippers vs Charlotte Hornets

November 14, 2015: (Pac-12 basketball) - Washington vs Texas

September 10, 2016: WWE Live 2016

October 9, 2016: NBA Pre-Season Game - Houston Rockets vs New Orleans Pelicans

September 21, 2017: NHL Pre-Season Game - Los Angeles Kings vs Vancouver Canucks

October 8, 2017: NBA Pre-Season Game - Golden State Warriors vs Minnesota Timberwolves

Other events
November 1, 2014: 2014 Parinama Shanghai Open and WDC & WDC AL World Trophy and Work Ranking Series (第2届回向国际舞上海公开赛)
June 25, 2015: Wild Star Press Conference
August 25, 2015: 锤子科技2015夏季新品发布会
October 31 - November 1, 2015:  2015 Parinama Shanghai Open(2015年WDC世界舞蹈锦标赛暨第三届回向国标舞上海公开赛)

References

Mercedes-Benz Arena (Shanghai)
Performing arts venues in Shanghai
Events in Shanghai
Lists of events by venue